My Definition may refer to:

 "My Defintion", an album by German electronic music DJ Tom Novy
 "My Definition of a Boombastic Jazz Style", a song by Canadian Jazz rap band Dream Warriors, on their album And Now the Legacy Begins, which repeatedly features the phrase "My Definition" in its chorus